The Ministry of Finance is an Indonesian government ministry responsible for the nation's finance and state assets. The Finance Minister is responsible to the President. The ministry's motto is Nagara Dana Rakça, which means "guardian of state finance".

History

Colonial Period
The Dutch East India Company was given  to print money during the rule of Governor General Jan Pieterszoon Coen. Since the 17th century, the Dutch East India Company increased state revenue. The company raised state revenue by an obligation to surrender agricultural products, restrictions on agricultural production (which increased the price) and obligations to plant strategic agricultural products such as coffee.

When the British took over Dutch East India as part of the War of the Sixth Coalition and assigned Stamford Raffles as Lieutenant-Governor, he instituted reformation through land tax, which changed the former Dutch system, to enable the public to buy British products with money. This reform failed to introduce a standardized monetary system because of a lack of support from the local aristocracy and inadequate public knowledge of money and taxation calculation.

After the Napoleonic Wars, Dutch East India was returned to the Dutch by the British under the Anglo-Dutch Treaty of 1814. Governor General Du Bus resumed economic development and established  as part of financial and payment system reform. In 1836, van den Bosch introduced forced plantation to produce global-favored products. Forced plantation replaced the land tax system and aimed to introduce monetary economics to society. Forced plantation and forced labor had sufficient effect to introduce monetary economics.

Government policy was shifted into liberal economics. The policy was implemented as "laissez faire, laissez passer", in which economic responsibility is shifted to the private sector. The Department of Finance was established to coordinate, develop and support financial administration. Centralized financial administration was done to facilitate management of state revenue and expenditure.

The Second World War put the Dutch colonial government in a difficult position. Before the Japanese landing, the President of De Javasche Bank,  Dr. G.G. van Buttingha Wichers, sent gold deposits to South Africa and Australia from Cilacap. The Japanese colonial government forced the surrender of British, Dutch and Chinese Bank and invasion money. The war created a financial crisis.

Early Independence
After Japan's surrender to the Allied powers in August 1945, Indonesia declared independence. Ministry of Finance is officially established to replace the function of Departement van Financien.

The economic situation was dire because of high inflation (due to circulation of De Javasche Bank money, Dutch East Indies money and Japanese Yen). Dr. Samsi, as Minister of Finance, had information that Escompto Bank in Surabaya held reserve money from the Dutch Colonial Government.

Organization
Based on Presidential Decree No. 57/2020, Ministry of Finance is organized into the following:

 Office of the Deputy Minister of Finance
 Secretariat General
 Directorate General of the State Budget
 Directorate General of Taxes
 Directorate General of Customs and Excise
 Directorate General of the Treasury
 Directorate General of State Assets Management
 Directorate General of Fiscal Balance
 Directorate General of Debt and Risk Management
 Inspectorate General
 Fiscal Policy Agency
 Education and Financial Training Agency
 Expert in Tax Law and Enforcement
 Expert in Tax Conformity
 Expert in Tax Supervision
 Expert in State Revenue
 Expert in State Expenditure
 Expert in Macroeconomics and International Finance
 Expert in Financial Services and Stock Market
 Expert in Organization, Bureaucracy, and Information Technology
 Expert in Legal and Inter-agency Relationship

Task and Functions
Ministry of Finance Tasks and Functions are regulated by Presidential Decree No. 57/2020,

Task
To run governance in terms of state finance in order to assist the President in running state governance.

Functions
Formulating, stipulating, and implementing policies in terms of budgeting, taxes, customs and excise, treasury, state assets management, fiscal balance, and budget financing and risk management;
Formulating, stipulating and providing recommendations in fiscal and financial sector policies;
Coordinating tasks implementation, developing, and providing administration support to entire elements of organization in the Ministry of Finance;
Managing State properties/assets that are under the responsibility of the Ministry of Finance;
Supervising tasks implementation in the Ministry of Finance;
Holding technical guidance and supervision for the Minister of Finance’s affairs in regions;
Implementing technical activities from central to regions;
Holding education, training, and competence certification in terms of State finance; and
Providing substantial support to entire elements of organization in the Ministry of Finance

List of Minister of Finance

See also

 Directorate General of Customs and Excise
 Directorate General of Taxes

References

Finance
Indonesia
Finance in Indonesia